Al Green's Greatest Hits is a 1975 greatest hits release by soul singer Al Green. In 2003, the album was ranked number 52 on Rolling Stone magazine's list of the 500 greatest albums of all time, maintaining the rating in a 2012 revised list. The album's ranking dropped to number 456 in the 2020 revised list. The compilation has consistently ranked as one of the best executed 'greatest hits' albums in history. The album peaked at No. 3 on the Billboard Top Soul LPs  chart and No. 17 on the Top LPs chart.

Track listing

Original LP

1995 CD re-release

Personnel
(The following credits refer to Al Green – Greatest Hits: Deluxe Edition.)
 James Mitchell – Baritone Saxophone, String Arrangements
 Cheryl Pawelski – Production Assistant
 Michael Allen – Piano
 Teenie Hodges – Guitar
 Charles Hodges – Organ, Piano
 Leroy Hodges – Bass
 Howard Grimes – Bongos, Drums, Conga
 Archie Turner – Piano
 Al Jackson Jr. – Drums, Percussion
 Andrew Love – Horn (Tenor)
 Wayne Jackson – Trumpet
 Jack Hale – Trombone
 Ed Logan – Horn (Tenor)
 Rhodes, Chalmers & Rhodes – Background vocals
 Willie Mitchell – Producer, Engineer, Remixing
 Tami Masak – Production Assistant
 Robert Vosgien – Remastering
 Richard Kriegler – Art Direction, Design
 Richard E. Roth – Art Direction, Design
 Kevin Flaherty – Producer
 Tom Cartwright – Executive Producer
 Howard Craft – Mastering
 Buddy Rosenburg – Photography
 Chris Clough – Producer
 Bob Levy – Photography
 Ali Muhammed Jackson – Bongos, Drums, Conga
 Susan Lavoie – Art Direction
 Charles Chalmers – String Arrangements
 Margaret Goldfarb – Production Assistant
 Dan Hersch – Mastering
 Bill Inglot – Mastering Consultant
 Kathy Kinslow – Production Assistant
 Charles Levan – Production Assistant
 Al Green – Producer

References

1975 greatest hits albums
Al Green albums
Albums produced by Willie Mitchell (musician)
Hi Records compilation albums